The following outline is provided as an overview of and topical guide to the United States Virgin Islands:

The Territory of the United States Virgin Islands is an unincorporated organized territory of the United States of America located in the western portion of the Virgin Islands Archipelago in the Caribbean Sea.  The Virgin Islands are part of the Leeward Islands of the Lesser Antilles.  The British Virgin Islands comprises the eastern portion of the archipelago.

The U.S. Virgin Islands consist of the main islands of Saint Croix, Saint John and Saint Thomas, along with the much smaller but historically distinct Water Island, and many other surrounding minor islands. The total land area of the territory is 346.36 km2 (133.73 sq mi). As of the 2000 census the population was 108,612.

Three of the main islands have nicknames often used by locals: "Rock City" (St. Thomas), "Love City" (St. John), and "Twin City" (St. Croix).

General reference

 Pronunciation:
 Common English country names:  The United States Virgin Islands or the U.S. Virgin Islands
 Official English country name:  The Territory of the United States Virgin Islands
 Common endonym(s):  
 Official endonym(s):  
 Adjectival(s): Virgin Island
 Demonym(s): Virgin Islander
 Etymology: Name of the United States Virgin Islands
 ISO country codes:  VI, VIR, 850
 ISO region codes:  See ISO 3166-2:VI
 Internet country code top-level domain:  .vi

Geography of the United States Virgin Islands

Geography of the United States Virgin Islands
 The United States Virgin Islands are: an insular area of the United States
 Location:
 Northern Hemisphere and Western Hemisphere
 North America (though not on the mainland)
 Atlantic Ocean
 Caribbean (West Indies)
 Antilles
 Lesser Antilles
 Leeward Islands
 Virgin Islands archipelago
 Time zone:  Eastern Caribbean Time (UTC-04)
 Extreme points of the United States Virgin Islands
 High:  Crown Mountain 
 Low:  Caribbean Sea 0 m
 Land boundaries:  none
 Coastline:  188 km
 Population of the United States Virgin Islands: 

 Area of the United States Virgin Islands: 
 Atlas of the United States Virgin Islands

Environment of the United States Virgin Islands

 Climate of the United States Virgin Islands
 Renewable energy in the United States Virgin Islands
 Geology of the United States Virgin Islands
 Protected areas of the United States Virgin Islands
 Biosphere reserves in the United States Virgin Islands
 National parks of the United States Virgin Islands
 Superfund sites in the United States Virgin Islands
 Wildlife of the United States Virgin Islands
 Fauna of the United States Virgin Islands
 Birds of the United States Virgin Islands
 Mammals of the United States Virgin Islands

Natural geographic features of the United States Virgin Islands
 Fjords of the United States Virgin Islands
 Islands of the United States Virgin Islands
 Lakes of the United States Virgin Islands
 Mountains of the United States Virgin Islands
 Volcanoes in the United States Virgin Islands
 Rivers of the United States Virgin Islands
 Waterfalls of the United States Virgin Islands
 Valleys of the United States Virgin Islands
 World Heritage Sites in the United States Virgin Islands: None

Regions of the United States Virgin Islands

Regions of the United States Virgin Islands

Ecoregions of the United States Virgin Islands

List of ecoregions in the United States Virgin Islands
 Ecoregions in the United States Virgin Islands

Administrative divisions of the United States Virgin Islands

Administrative divisions of the United States Virgin Islands
 Provinces of the United States Virgin Islands
 Districts of the United States Virgin Islands
 Municipalities of the United States Virgin Islands

Provinces of the United States Virgin Islands

Provinces of the United States Virgin Islands

Districts of the United States Virgin Islands

Districts of the United States Virgin Islands

Municipalities of the United States Virgin Islands

Municipalities of the United States Virgin Islands
 Capital of the United States Virgin Islands: Charlotte Amalie
 Cities of the United States Virgin Islands

Demography of the United States Virgin Islands

Demographics of the United States Virgin Islands

Government and politics of the United States Virgin Islands

Politics of the United States Virgin Islands
 Form of government: presidential representative democratic dependency
 Capital of the United States Virgin Islands: Charlotte Amalie
 Elections in the United States Virgin Islands
 Political parties in the United States Virgin Islands

Branches of the government of the United States Virgin Islands

Government of the United States Virgin Islands

Legislative branch of the government of the United States Virgin Islands

 Parliament of the United States Virgin Islands (bicameral)
 Upper house: Senate of the United States Virgin Islands
 Lower house: House of Commons of the United States Virgin Islands

Judicial branch of the government of the United States Virgin Islands

Court system of the United States Virgin Islands
 Supreme Court of the United States Virgin Islands

Foreign relations of the United States Virgin Islands

Foreign relations of the United States Virgin Islands
 Diplomatic missions in the United States Virgin Islands
 Diplomatic missions of the United States Virgin Islands

International organization membership
The Territory of the United States Virgin Islands is a member of:
International Olympic Committee (IOC)
Universal Postal Union (UPU)
World Federation of Trade Unions (WFTU)

Law and order in the United States Virgin Islands

Law of the United States Virgin Islands
 Cannabis in the United States Virgin Islands
 Constitution of the United States Virgin Islands
 Crime in the United States Virgin Islands
 Human rights in the United States Virgin Islands
 LGBT rights in the United States Virgin Islands
 Freedom of religion in the United States Virgin Islands
 Law enforcement in the United States Virgin Islands

Military of the United States Virgin Islands

Military of the United States Virgin Islands
 Command
 Commander-in-chief:
 Ministry of Defence of the United States Virgin Islands
 Forces
 Army of the United States Virgin Islands
 Navy of the United States Virgin Islands
 Air Force of the United States Virgin Islands
 Special forces of the United States Virgin Islands
 Military history of the United States Virgin Islands
 Military ranks of the United States Virgin Islands

Local government in the United States Virgin Islands

Local government in the United States Virgin Islands

History of the United States Virgin Islands

History of the United States Virgin Islands
 Timeline of the history of the United States Virgin Islands
 Current events of the United States Virgin Islands

History of the United States Virgin Islands, by period
Indigenous peoples of the Virgin Islands
Ciboney
Arawaks
Caribs
First European contact, 1493–1519
On November 14, 1493, a Spanish fleet under the command of Christoffa Corombo (Christopher Columbus) lands on a large inhabited island which he names Santa Cruz (Holy Cross, now Saint Croix).  Corombo then visits and names San Tomas (Saint Thomas) and San Juan (Saint John).  Corombo names the archipelago Santa Ursula y las Once Mil Vírgenes (Saint Ursula and her 11,000 virgins, now the Virgin Islands).
Viceroyalty of New Spain, (1519–1650)-1821
French West Indies, 1650–1733
France wrests Saint Croix from Spain, 1650
Knights Hospitaller acquire Saint Croix from France, 1660
France reacquires Saint Croix from Knights Hospitaller, 1665
Denmark purchases Saint Croix from France, 1733
Danish West Indies, 1657–1917
British occupation, 1801–1802
British occupation, 1807–1815
World War I, June 28, 1914 – November 11, 1918
United States purchases Danish West Indies from Denmark on January 17, 1917
Unorganized U.S. territory of the Virgin Islands, March 31, 1917 – June 22, 1936
United States enters World War I on April 6, 1917
Territory of the Virgin Islands of the United States since June 22, 1936
Organic Act of the Virgin Islands of the United States of June 22, 1936
World War II, September 1, 1939 – September 2, 1945
United States enters Second World War on December 8, 1941
Cold War, March 5, 1946 – December 25, 1991
Korean War, June 25, 1950 – July 27, 1953
Revised Organic Act of the Virgin Islands of the United States of July 22, 1954
Virgin Islands National Park established on August 2, 1956
Vietnam War, September 26, 1959 – April 30, 1975
Persian Gulf War, August 2, 1990 – February 28, 1991
Hurricane Marilyn, 1995
Attacks on the United States on September 11, 2001
Afghanistan War, since October 7, 2001
Iraq War, since March 20, 2003

Culture of the United States Virgin Islands

Culture of the United States Virgin Islands
 Architecture of the United States Virgin Islands
 Cuisine of the United States Virgin Islands
 Festivals in the United States Virgin Islands
 Languages of the United States Virgin Islands
 Media in the United States Virgin Islands
 National symbols of the United States Virgin Islands
 Coat of arms of the United States Virgin Islands
 Flag of the United States Virgin Islands
 National anthem of the United States Virgin Islands
 People of the United States Virgin Islands
 Public holidays in the United States Virgin Islands
 Records of the United States Virgin Islands
 Religion in the United States Virgin Islands
 Christianity in the United States Virgin Islands
 Hinduism in the United States Virgin Islands
 Islam in the United States Virgin Islands
 Judaism in the United States Virgin Islands
 Sikhism in the United States Virgin Islands
 World Heritage Sites in the United States Virgin Islands: None

Art in the United States Virgin Islands
 Art in the United States Virgin Islands
 Cinema of the United States Virgin Islands
 Literature of the United States Virgin Islands
 Music of the United States Virgin Islands
 Television in the United States Virgin Islands
 Theatre in the United States Virgin Islands

Sports in the United States Virgin Islands

Sports in the United States Virgin Islands
 Football in the United States Virgin Islands

Economy and infrastructure of the United States Virgin Islands

Economy of the United States Virgin Islands
 Economic rank, by nominal GDP (2007):
 Agriculture in the United States Virgin Islands
 Banking in the United States Virgin Islands
 National Bank of the United States Virgin Islands
 Communications in the United States Virgin Islands
 Internet in the United States Virgin Islands
 Companies of the United States Virgin Islands
Currency of the United States Virgin Islands: Dollar
ISO 4217: USD
 Energy in the United States Virgin Islands
 Energy policy of the United States Virgin Islands
 Oil industry in the United States Virgin Islands
 Mining in the United States Virgin Islands
 Tourism in the United States Virgin Islands
 Transport in the United States Virgin Islands
 the United States Virgin Islands Stock Exchange

Education in the United States Virgin Islands

Education in the United States Virgin Islands

Infrastructure of the United States Virgin Islands
 Health care in the United States Virgin Islands
 Transportation in the United States Virgin Islands
 Airports in the United States Virgin Islands
 Rail transport in the United States Virgin Islands
 Roads in the United States Virgin Islands
 Water supply and sanitation in the United States Virgin Islands

See also

Topic overview:
United States Virgin Islands

Index of United States Virgin Islands-related articles
Bibliography of the United States Virgin Islands

References

External links

 Official sites
 Convention between the United States and Denmark for cession of the Danish West Indies - Document signed in New York, August 4, 1916
Historic Places in Puerto Rico and the U.S. Virgin Islands, a National Park Service Discover Our Shared Heritage Travel Itinerary
 Transfer Day - Denmark's consulate in the U.S. Virgin Islands
 Virgin Islands - The World Factbook, CIA Publications
 "Scholten and the emancipation of Danish Slaves in the Danish West Indies" 
 USVI Governor's Website - Governor John P. deJongh's Website
USGS real-time, geographic, and other scientific resources of Virgin Islands
 Office of the Lieutenant Governor - Office of Lt. Governor Gregory R. Francis

 News and media
 The Virgin Islands Daily News - Daily newspaper in St. Thomas covering the entire USVI
 Virgin Islands Source - Daily online news source from St. Croix, St. John & St. Thomas
 St. John Tradewinds - Weekly newspaper in St. John

United States Virgin Islands
 1